David Graham (January 6, 1924 – November 3, 2015) was an American casting director. Graham was in the United States Army Air Force, after which he received his first role on an acting job in a summer stock production of The Male Animal.

He first appeared on Broadway in a play produced by the renowned David Merrick titled Bright Boy. He spent the next two years as editor of the weekly Theatrical Calendar.

He edited a publication of Ross Reports on television for two years and produced the Carlo Goldoni play La Locandiera (The Mistress of the Inn) for Equity Library Theatre.

External links
IMDB.com

References 

David Graham, American casting director, Died at 91. Obituary. 19 November 2015.

1924 births
2015 deaths
American musical theatre directors
United States Army Air Forces soldiers